Jebal Maqla is a mountain located in northwest Saudi Arabia, near the Jordan border, above the Gulf of Aqaba, and is located in Tabūk, Saudi Arabia.

Maqla is one of the tallest mountains in the Arabian Peninsula and the estimated terrain elevation is around 2,326 metres (7,631 feet) ASL. It is in the Madiyan Mountains. Variant forms of spelling for Jabal Maqla 'or in other languages: El-Maqla, Jabal Magla', Al-Makla, Jabal Maqla '(ar), Al-Makla, El-Maqla, El-Maqla, Jabal Magla`, Jabal Magla 'Jabal Maqla`, Jabal Maqla'.
Its name means Burnt Mountain which is attributed to the black igneous rocks that cap the otherwise lighter brown coloured mountain.

The Peak is located at latitude 28.5967417 N, longitude 35.3354917 E or latitude 28° 35' 48.27"N, longitude 35° 20' 7.77"E
About 3500 Feet or 1 km on the North/West facing side,
is an odd light coloured Pentagon shape, of sides about 250 Feet or 76 Metres, viewable with Google Satellite.
The pentagons centre is located latitude 28.606182 N, longitude 35.325586 E or latitude 28°36'22.3"N, longitude 35°19'32.1"E.

The town of Al-Bad', Saudi Arabia lies to the north. The mountain is near one of the tallest in Saudi Arabia, Jabal al-Lawz, which is about 7 kilometers to the north and a few hundred meters taller.

In discussions about the location of Biblical Mount Sinai Saudi Arabia and biblical Mount Sinai, Jabal Maqla or Jabal Maqlā ('Burnt Mountain') is often believed to be Jabal al-Lawz by various authors such as Bob Cornuke, Ron Wyatt, and Lennart Möller as shown by local and regional maps and noted by other investigators.

Geology
The summit of Jabal Maqlā consists mainly of dark-colored hornfels derived from metamorphosed volcanic rocks that originally were silicic and mafic lava flows, tuff breccias, and fragmental greenstones. The middle and lower slopes of Jabal Maqlā consist of light-colored granite, which has intruded into the overlying hornfels. This is the same granite that comprises Jabal al-Lawz. Jabal Maqla is about 7 kilometers to the south, and a few hundred meters lower.

References

Maqla
Midian
Geology of Saudi Arabia
Volcanism of Saudi Arabia